Marcela de Sousa Barrozo (born Niterói, Rio de Janeiro, January 21, 1992) is a Brazilian theatre and screen actress.

TV career 
 2002 - Sabor da Paixão .... Madona
 2003 - Chocolate com Pimenta .... Estela Albuquerque
 2004 - Senhora do Destino .... Bianca Ferreira da Silva
 2005/2007 - Os Amadores .... Maria
 2006 - Malhação .... Antônia Valença
 2006 - JK .... Maria "Nana" da Conceição (child)
 2007/2008 - Duas Caras .... Ramona Monteiro Duarte
 2009 - Bela, a Feia .... Ludmila Freitas
 2015 - Os Dez Mandamentos .... Betania

Theatre career 
 2001 - Severina .... Nena
 2004 - Adolescente Faz Cada Uma
 2005/2006 - O Rapto das Cebolinhas .... Lúcia

External links 
 

Living people
1992 births
Brazilian stage actresses
Brazilian telenovela actresses
People from Niterói